021 is an area code used for cities in many countries.

021 may also refer to:

Codex Campianus, a manuscript
Type 021-class missile boat, a missile boat class

See also
O21 (disambiguation)
21 (disambiguation)